Meira is municipality in the Galician province of Lugo. It is in the northwest of the province, including the Terra Chá and the Serras Orientais to the west of the Serra de Meira. The most popular festivals are those of the candles, carnival, corpus, Santa Maria (15 August), San Roque, and the Festa da Malha.

Parishes
 Meira (Santa María)
 Seixosmil (Santo Isidro)

References

Municipalities in the Province of Lugo